Hank Rutherford Hill (born April 15, 1953) is a fictional character and the main protagonist of the Fox animated television series King of the Hill. He lives in the fictional town of Arlen, Texas, with his family and works as the assistant manager of a local branch of Strickland Propane. He likes to drink beer, typically Alamo brand, in the alley behind his house with his friends. He is voiced by series creator Mike Judge. The Economist described Hank Hill as one of the wisest people on television, and in 1997 Texas Monthly included him on its annual list of the most influential Texans.

Development
When Mike Judge submitted the pilot script and drawings for King of the Hill to the Fox network, network executives advised him that Hank Hill should be younger than 49 years old, as Judge had described the character. Judge received a phone message from a network executive who told him that Hank's age should be 32, the same age as the network's average viewer. Judge later said, "I got all angry, and then I was like, 'Well, wait. It's just a drawing.' So I just went back with the same drawing and said, 'Okay, he's 34.'"

Hank has been compared to Tom Anderson, the "disapproving old man" who is a neighbor of the title characters on Judge's earlier series Beavis and Butt-Head. Television columnist Frank Wooten of  The Post and Courier has written, "Hank still looks and sounds like a young Mr. Anderson (beleaguered, baffled Korean War veteran of 'Beavis and Butt-head'). But he's more in touch with contemporary reality (sort of) -- and funnier." Throughout the show's run, Hank's character's personality appears to primarily be built around the image of the all American, authoritarian family man. In a 2006 interview, Judge said, "Originally I was going to have Hank be his [Mr. Anderson's] son. I was kind of thinking we'd tie it into "Beavis and Butt-Head" as a sort of spinoff or something, but Fox said no." Greg Daniels, another creator of the program, has said that Hank Hill is "based on a lot of neighbors I've had… He's upset about how America is changing, and he doesn't know what to do about it."

Character biography

Early life and family
Hank Hill was born at Yankee Stadium in The Bronx, New York.  According to the episode "Yankee Hankie," Hank proudly believed he was born in Texas to Tilly Mae Hill and Cotton Lyndal Hill but finds (to his disgust and horror) that he was actually born in New York City. His mother told him she gave birth to Hank in the women's restroom at Yankee Stadium during Cotton's failed attempt to assassinate Fidel Castro during a rare American visit. Fidel Castro visited New York City on April 19, implying that April 19 is Hank's birthday. After referring to himself as a native Texan for forty years, he was sad to learn he was born in New York, but over time, accepted his heritage when he realized that many of the Alamo heroes were not from Texas, either. Hank, who previously thought he was an only child, finds out he has a Japanese half brother named Junichiro in the episode "Returning Japanese". This is due to an affair Cotton Hill had with his Japanese nurse while recovering from leg injuries in post-World War II Japan. Also, in the episode "Hank Gets Dusted", Hank is shown to be the cousin of ZZ Top bassist and vocalist Dusty Hill.

Hank is an Eagle Scout. Hank is set in his ways and afraid of taking risks, but generally a good person. Although he is traditionally conservative in his attitude, in how he dislikes change and novel situations, he can adapt to them quite well, quickly mastering unfamiliar social milieus. He can be pushed too far on occasion, usually by his son, Bobby, and neighbors Bill Dauterive, Dale Gribble, and, (to a lesser extent) Boomhauer.
Most openings of King of the Hill start with Hank, Dale, Bill and Boomhauer all agreeing to something before the action kicks in, drinking from Alamo branded beer cans. A running joke throughout the series is an angry Hank yelling "I'm gonna kick your ass!" This is just a threat; he rarely, if ever, harms anyone, though he has literally kicked at least two people in the posterior out of anger (an acupuncturist in "Hank's Unmentionable Problem" and Jimmy Wichard in "Life in the Fast Lane: Bobby's Saga"). Hank's honesty and naivety often get him in unpredictable and troublesome situations. Ultimately, Hank cares for the people around him, particularly his family and friends and is always out to do what is right. One characteristic that Hank shows is when he lies to someone, he turns his head or looks around the room.

Working life
Hank is a known workaholic and workplace overachiever who sells "propane and propane accessories" as an assistant manager at the fictional Strickland Propane, a local propane dealership. Much to the discomfort of his boss, Buck Strickland, he refuses to miss a day for anything; including sickness and injury, as shown in the episode called "Hank's Back", where he refused to go on Worker's Compensation after injuring his back on the job, despite repeated attempts at suggesting too much work will make him sloppy. He even went into work when his hero Tom Landry died (though he thought it was Dusty Hill making it up). When he gets a phone call in the middle of the night, he often immediately starts with the Strickland slogan, "Strickland Propane, taste the meat, not the heat", showing his dedication to his work. Hank also has a habit of announcing himself as "Hank Hill, Assistant Manager, Strickland Propane", even in situations where it has nothing to do with his work such as when called on to give a speech as Patch Boomhauer's best man at his wedding rehearsal dinner. Hank's family is well aware of his devotion to propane; he refers to the gas as 'sweet lady propane', acknowledging that he and his wife Peggy have an agreement on the matter. Peggy herself has referred to herself as a 'propane wife'. 

He was briefly promoted to manager when Buck's wife/ex-wife (affectionately referred to as "Miz Liz") temporarily took over Strickland Propane. Hank was also briefly promoted to manager by Buck Strickland while helping Buck rebuild a house for Habitat for Humanity as part of Buck's community service after a drunk driving conviction, before being demoted again after he blurted out "I love you" to Buck. Unlike Buck and his business enemy, Milton Farnsworth "M.F." Thatherton, Hank believes that selling propane through honesty and hard work is what life is all about. Hank won the Propane Salesman of the Year Award for three years, as well as the prestigious Blue Flame of Valor Award. His greatest attribute is his reliability. Another trait of Hank appears to be customer loyalty and customer satisfaction. While appearing to suffer a sales slump during the month-long "Grill Stravaganza" sale, he remained confident his sales would come in at the end of the month, trusting his tried and true method of giving customers pamphlets and simply telling them to return if and only if they're "ready." Despite this, he managed to sell more propane than anyone else at Strickland in a single day by simply giving one customer that pamphlet; he later sold that single customer 500 units, and in doing so won the sales for the Grill Stravaganza. Strickland has referred to Hank as his golden goose. This virtue was tested when he threatened to quit rather than continue working at a carwash (which Buck and Kahn bought stake in) and continue to take verbal abuse. He also threatened to quit unless Buck fired a new employee who was making crude jokes and sexual innuendo (eventually in frustration, Hank actually dragged the new employee into the washroom and washed his mouth out with soap). Hank's work ethic extends past his occupation. He is a noted DIY enthusiast. The meticulous detail to which he maintains his home was reflected when he opted to submit it for Parade of Homes.

Hank looks up to Buck, who calls Hank "Ol' Top".  And Hank keeps a somewhat idyllic picture of Buck, even though he recognizes his boss's many shortcomings (excessive gambling, alcoholism, womanizing, and a general lack of principles). Hank must frequently clean up his boss's unsavory "situations":  bailing him out of jail, facilitating his vices, and performing suspicious errands. In one episode he went as far as covering up Strickland's illegal price fixing agreement with the other local propane providers to keep him from being arrested. Hank also seems to think that being a propane salesman is the best job there is (and wants his son, Bobby Hill, to follow his footsteps and start a propane business of his own). Hank loves his job very much, but throughout the series always makes a big deal out of it when his closest friends and even family find his occupation boring and somewhat useless and even find his obsession with propane odd. In the episode "A Fire Fighting We Will Go," Bobby questions Hank about his new job as a volunteer fireman, in which Bobby says he is surprised because Hank always seems to exaggerate and make a big deal about being a propane salesman.

Personal life
In the first episode of the series, his wife Peggy Hill prompts Hank to tell his son that he loves him. After he finally manages to do so, Bobby says that he thought of himself as a "big disappointment," which Hank immediately rejects, earnestly declaring that Bobby is the one thing in town that has never disappointed him. Although Hank is often confused and irritated by Bobby's eccentricities, he clearly loves his son, even though he's uncomfortable in saying it to his face. He even feigns an interest in Bobby's passions such as prop comedy and theatre. Hank is relieved when his Laotian-American neighbor Kahn Souphanousinphone tells him that he caught Bobby and Connie taking their clothes off since, up until that time, Hank was uncertain of Bobby's interest in girls. From his eccentricities, Hank often says of Bobby, "That boy ain't right. I tell you what.”

Hank suffers from a fictional genetic disorder called Diminished Gluteal Syndrome (DGS). His essentially non-existent buttocks provide insufficient cushioning when he sits, causing him great discomfort and eventually forcing him to wear an "ortho-gluteal" prosthesis. A running gag throughout the series is that Hank and Peggy would have more kids if not for Hank's narrow urethra, a topic Hank is sensitive about and often becomes annoyed about if brought up to people outside the immediate family.

Hank was on the high school football team (as were Bill, Boomhauer, and team towel manager, Dale). He was a running back and led the league in rushing (his record remains unbroken). He had a promising career until he snapped his ankle in the state championship (although this cost Arlen the game, he is still celebrated for "taking them to State"). This incident exacerbated Hank's already-restrained emotionalism, as he saw it as punishment from God for doing a celebratory dance after scoring a touchdown earlier during the game. After graduating from high school, he went on to work as a salesman at Jeans West, a clothing retailer, until Buck found that he was a good salesman and hired him at Strickland Propane, where he taught Hank everything about propane and propane accessories. According to his neighbor Dale, he also had a brief stint as a tractor salesman.

Although his career in propane is later shown to have started with a chance meeting with Buck Strickland, in episode "Order of the Straight Arrow", a flashback to 1965 shows younger Hank, Dale, Bill and Boomhauer on a scouting trip, talking about what they're going to do when they grow up. Hank says, "I'm going to sell propane and propane accessories... if my grades are good enough," which is confusing since he met Buck at Jeans West, although it can be explained if Hank mistakenly puts in his adult passion for propane into memories from his childhood, or it may have been possible that Hank had to work at Jeans West due to a tight job market and his goal of working in propane was finally realized with the sale to Buck. This same episode reveals that boys entering the Order are 12 years old, which would give Hank a birth date of sometime in 1953. In the second-season episode, "Hank's Dirty Laundry," Hank himself states his birth year as 1953.

Hank drives a red Ford Super Duty, which replaced his original truck, a red SuperCab Ford Ranger (1983 or 1993 model depends on the episodes) after it was destroyed by a train, despite trying to make it last as long as mechanically possible. Both trucks have manual transmissions while the Ranger carries a bed mounted toolbox for times when Hank takes his truck out on Strickland-related business. He gives great love and affection to his lawn and his bloodhound, Ladybird. In one episode, Peggy is bitter for throwing a special birthday party for Ladybird but not for herself, where it is implied in some episodes she believes Hank spends more time with Ladybird and being house proud than he does with her, as suggested in another episode where he mourns over his sub-par lawn compared to his neighbors, remarking. "I put so much work into this, my sweat, blood, tears, all the tender feelings I've kept from my family."

Hank's idol is Outlaw Country singer Willie Nelson (despite multiple differences between the personalities and lifestyles of the two), and he also plays a 1963 Guild Solid Top acoustic guitar named Betsy in his Bluegrass band. Hank is a fan of Country and Bluegrass music. Occasionally, he will listen to Southern Rock music and in one episode, remarks that he likes "this Zamfir fellow," even believing that his music was better than The Beatles. He considers his cousin Dusty's band ZZ Top to be a family shame. Another episode shows that Hank and his friends seem to like the song "Teddy Bear" by Red Sovine. In another, he had also shown approval towards Doo-wop. He also appears to have a soft spot for Foreigner, as on Luanne's 21st birthday he put "I Want to Know What Love Is" on the jukebox six times in a row. Hank seems to dislike Christian Rock music, as in "Reborn To Be Wild", Hank told Bobby's youth group leader, "You're not making Christianity better, you're just making Rock & Roll worse". He took a slight interest in boyband music namely due to their lack of explicit lyrics compared to obscenity-filled rap and failing to understand the demographic the music was meant for.

Hank is 6'2", as shown on his driver's license.

Personality
Much of the humor of the show results from the collision of Hank's deeply conservative manner, nature, and philosophy with the world and people around him. He is uncomfortable with intimacy and with expressions of affection or sexuality (as demonstrated by the running joke throughout the series, in which Hank is extremely averse and overreacts to physical contact or anything sexual concerning his niece, Luanne), but he has a healthy relationship with his wife, as well as the rest of his family, except his father. He believes passionately in hard work, honesty, tradition, responsibility, and convention (he refuses to leave work early, even so much as 10 minutes early on a Friday); and is a proud Texan and American always trying his best to see others, regardless of culture, for their personal character. He is, however, a highly respected authority among his friends and family, who often seek his help and advice, knowing that he will always advocate doing the right thing in the right way.

Hank is against charcoal, butane (which he refers to as a "bastard gas") and the use of propane alternatives (such as electric water-heaters, heaters, stoves and ovens). Hank believes that propane is the best source of fuel and is known to try to "convert" people to propane use. When niece Luanne Platter uses charcoal on burgers at a barbecue, Peggy and Bobby find them delicious and eat them all: they are horrified to learn that they enjoy charcoal grilling. Hank's love for propane is sometimes shown in an ironic juxtaposition with his love of all things Texas, for example being introduced to mesquite, a traditional Texan barbecue wood, by his immigrant neighbor Kahn.

One of Hank's most treasured hobbies is the care he takes over his lawn. He's unofficially nominated the best lawn in the neighborhood. He rides a fictional "Mason" 1500 series Riding mower, a mower he also covets to the point when the Mason Corporation undertook the focus group discontinuing his model in favor of a new one, he managed to point out all the flaws in the engineering and convince the group the mower was inferior. In the episode "King of the Ant Hill" with Cinco de Mayo approaching, Hank purchases an exorbitant new lawn of Raleigh St. Augustine sod for $1.25 per square foot, which Dale destroys with fire ants as an act of revenge to Hank for terminating his exterminating services. Just as Hank is about to beat him up, Dale redeems himself by saving Bobby from the fire ants, who attacked him for confining them. His friends and neighbors gifted him with a few square feet of new Raleigh, albeit only enough to cover a small fraction of his front yard. When he converted his back yard into a putting green, he installed kikuyu grass. In only one episode did Hank purposely allow his lawn to die; when water restrictions and a drought forced Hank to run for public office on a platform opposing the city water policy which wasted more water than it saved. He later discovered Kahn was bribing the water department employee to keep his lawn green and Bobby blackmailed him to keep Hank's lawn from dying. Refusing to be corrupt, he ceased watering. Hank has also states that he has held back "tender feelings" towards his family in order to focus on the lawn.

Hank resides in a single-story rancher, which he claims has historic value. He is a noted do it yourself (DIY) enthusiast and prides himself on homeownership, to the point where he completely distrusts repairmen and refuses initially to call them during times of crisis, even during a few incidents where he was unable to solve the problem on his own. He is skilled in home repair, lawn and garden and automotive repair. He meticulously obeys virtually every building code in the city ordinance. He gets a great deal of joy engaging in home repair and his level of skill (and attention to detail) was repeatedly shown to exceed that of workmen he employed.

Hank is also a follower of sports. He is a huge fan of football, being a former player himself. He is a long-time fan of the Dallas Cowboys, but later allows himself to also be a fan of the Houston Texans because they play in a different conference and wouldn't play the Cowboys unless it was in an all-Texas Super Bowl. Contemplating the possibility, Hank states dreamily "An all Texas Superbowl.. His will be done". Hank also is a supporter of the Texas Longhorns.  He also follows baseball as a fan of the Texas Rangers, although in "Meet The Manger Babies", he stated that he would rather miss a baseball game than the Super Bowl to help Luanne with her puppet show. However, his idyllic passion is golf which coincides with his love of lawns. He once converted his back yard into a putting green. He is, however, critical of some sports. He is critical of soccer, claiming to Bobby "I didn't think I ever needed to tell you this, but I would be a bad parent if I didn't; soccer was invented by European ladies to keep them busy while their husbands did the cooking". He also hates tennis and appears to hate ice hockey as well.

While more of a stereotypical Southern redneck in earlier episodes, for example, idolizing outlaw singer Willie Nelson, Hank becomes more of a small town, middle-class conservative who is extremely law-abiding. Everybody looks to Hank when they have any seemingly useless or dull work that needs to be done. His gruff, temperamental, and impartial tendencies have been challenged a few times throughout the series, during which Hank always proves himself to be on top of his game.  When his dog Ladybird attacked a black repairman named Mack (voiced by Bernie Mac) working on their heating system, he was accused of being racist and portraying those feelings onto his dog, though it was later proven that he is not racist but that in fact he hates repairmen, as he prides himself on proper home maintenance. Before Ladybird had attacked Mack, Hank had told him that "A man should not be judged by the color of his skin but by the actions of his heart". He prides himself on having taken auto-shop in high school and refuses to let mechanics touch his truck, feeling that he can accomplish anything without help. Hank has briefly worked at Mega-Lo Mart as a propane salesman trainee after Mega-Lo Mart drove Strickland Propane out of business. Hank's reserved nature probably resulted from years of verbal abuse from his war-veteran father Cotton Hill. However, if sufficiently provoked, Hank has proven not to be a pushover, often ending disputes with his self-popularized quote "I'm gonna kick your ass!" (though he rarely follows through on this threat). He is also staunchly pro-Texas. In the episode "Texas City Twister," in which a tornado has torn off all his clothes, he is given the choice of covering himself with the Texas flag or a potted cactus. With barely a thought, he chooses the cactus, thereby sparing the flag.

He is for the most part an outspoken conservative (he once said dreamily that he missed voting for Ronald Reagan). He was initially a huge fan of George W. Bush, but after discovering he had a weak handshake, Hank suffered a crisis of conscience and was unsure if he could still vote for the man. Hank is a registered Republican, but has respect for some old-school Democrats such as fellow Texan and former US President Lyndon B. Johnson. His purebred Georgia bloodhound Ladybird is named after the wife of President Johnson, former First Lady Lady Bird Johnson, Hank has made mention that Ladybird's mom helped track down James Earl Ray, assassin of Dr. Martin Luther King Jr. after an attempted prison escape. However, Hank also shows deference to Jimmy Carter when they meet (though he later refers to him as a "one-termer") and greatly respects former Democratic Texas Governor Ann Richards (although he displays great respect for, and deference to, all authority figures, but the respect was most likely the result of Hank's great liking of Texas culture and history as mentioned throughout the show). He has also expressed support for labor unions.

In nearly every episode, Hank and his friends Dale, Bill, and Boomhauer will stand about in the alley behind Hank's house, drinking Alamo beer and discussing the events of the day. When consensus is reached and at breaks in the conversation, they will give short words of agreement, such as "yup" or "mm-hmm". He considers his wife his best friend and feels that physically punishing children is wrong; he is verbally strict, but not directly abusive. In the episode "Sleight of Hank", it was revealed that Hank has a huge dislike for magicians after seeing David Copperfield make the Statue of Liberty disappear. He has shown to have chiroptophobia, the fear of bats.

Political parties aside, he is very conservative and old-fashioned, being largely ignorant (and disdainful) of new trends; several episodes involve him reluctantly dealing with subjects outside of his comfort zone, such as yoga, boybands, etc. Despite his discomfort with change and unfamiliar or awkward social situations and milieus, when his involvement is unavoidable, Hank repeatedly shows the ability to adapt to 
(and even learn from) them, even to immerse himself and become intellectually or emotionally invested in them — Hank's surprising ability to adapt to the awkward and uncomfortable is also evident from his good relations with all three members of the Nancy Gribble love triangle.  Hank is portrayed as having traditional family values and he is shown to be uncomfortable with hiring a woman to work at Strickland because she was believed to be too attractive, even though she was overqualified; instead, he hired a man for shallowly expressing a fondness for the Dallas Cowboys and a blatantly fraudulent adoration for propane. The man was later revealed to be a completely unreliable drug addict. His old-fashioned ways extend to a suspicion of new technology.  He does, however, eventually get a cellphone and briefly becomes addicted to a computer game whose main character is modeled on him. In the episode "Jumpin' Crack Bass", Hank made the mistake of purchasing crack cocaine he assumed was fish bait; when his liberal lawyer explained that virtually everyone including then-President Bill Clinton has consumed drugs, Hank comments, "Not my president! I voted for Dole!", referencing the 1996 election.

Hank is not entirely unbending in his habits. One of them is his discovery and embrace of organic meat in the episode "Raise the Steaks". He even goes as far as to defend hippies, something he seemed somewhat ashamed to do;  nevertheless, he agreed with them on the superior flavor of some natural and organic food. He has also been shown to have fairly tolerant views on other religions (except perhaps Buddhism). Hank has some environmentalist leanings (though he distances himself from the movement at large), once lamenting about air pollution in Houston, opposing the building of McMansions, and running for city council on a platform of removing low-flow toilets, in part, because they wasted more water than they saved. Similarly, he seems to believe in global warming, as when Dale commented on how warmer temperatures could lead to a citrus industry in Alaska, Hank responded "We live in Texas. It's already 110 in the summer, and if it gets one degree hotter I'm gonna kick your ass!" Despite his un-worldly outlook and occasional naiveté, he has been shown to be very clever in various scenarios. These include outwitting a rapacious lawyer who was attempting to sue Strickland Propane for an injury suffered on its premises by making it appear as though the injury occurred in his own law office, and forcing a veterinarian who was requiring costly and unnecessary tests for a soldier's cat to desist (in poetic irony, Hank began informing the vet's demanding clientele of an unneeded, but slightly superior, imaging machine the vet was unwilling to invest in). Hank also got the see-no-evil parents of a youngster who was bullying him to exert discipline by having Bobby behave exactly like their son toward them.

Hank can be gullible, as for 25 years he bought vehicles (five cars) at sticker price from Tom Hammond's dealership, thinking they were a great deal and Hammond was a true friend. He has also been tricked because of his relative ignorance concerning drugs or subcultures. Hence he once mistakenly bought vials of crack cocaine believing they were fishing bait and in a time of stress took a hit of marijuana because he thought it was a cigarette. He once introduced a woman named Tammy Duvall (voiced by Renée Zellweger), who later turned out to be a prostitute, to several business associates, she gifted him with a feather-tipped hat while driving his father's vintage Cadillac leading to the community to thinking that he was a pimp much to his horror. This led her former pimp, Alabaster Jones (voiced by Snoop Dogg), to believe he was her new pimp, a role he was forced to act out to rid her of him.

In "Be True to Your Fool", a flashback reveals that shortly after Hank graduated from high school with his three best friends, Dale, Bill, and Boomhauer, Bill enlisted in the United States Army—a night of celebratory drinking led them to a punk bar, where the then-formidable Bill saved a drunken Hank from a beating. In gratitude, Hank stumbled off to a tattoo parlor and paid to have Bill's name inked onto his chest before passing out. Only Boomhauer was with Hank, and, unable to persuade the proprietor to ignore Hank's purchase, convinced him to put the tattoo in a less conspicuous place, the back of Hank's head; Hank had completely forgotten that night, but was reminded of it while undergoing treatment for head lice in the present (an affliction caused by Bill trying to meet the school district's head lice lady). He had the name removed out of disgust, but eventually had a jailhouse tattoo of it put on to show Bill that the two were still friends.

Hank thinks very highly of Texas. He thinks that Texas is superior to all other states in the U.S or at least Hollywood. (This is a play on the stereotype of exaggerated Texas pride.) In the episode "Returning Japanese Part 1", Hank says "Peggy, I've already chosen the country for our summer vacation, America. And the state, Texas. And the town, Denton. I don't care what their police did to that cyclist. It's still a great town." Later in the episode, he also says to his father Cotton, "Dad, there is no other place I'd rather be," after Cotton said, "Hank, you work at a gas station; fuel this thing up and fly me back to Texas!". A recurring gag throughout the series is Hank's contempt for big cities and urban areas, once comparing a youth-oriented shopping center to "Hell, or Dallas", and, regarding San Antonio, asking "Why would anyone want to live there?" as he and Bobby watched a weather girl screw up on camera.

Character analysis
Describing Hank physically, Jo Johnson has written, "In keeping with [Mike] Judge's tradition of subtlety, the character of Hank Hill is only slightly overweight, not to satisfy the stereotype of the boorish husband, but because he eats a lot of meat and drinks a lot of beer."

Palmer-Mehta notes that Hank's "fervor for selling propane and propane accessories is nearly apostolic."  During their development of the character, the show's writers did substantial research on the propane business. Over time, members of the propane industry came to view Hank Hill as a largely positive image.

Ethan Thompson writes that although Hank Hill is similar to other sitcom father figures, such as Archie Bunker from All in the Family, he is different due to his "ability to acknowledge that the values and beliefs he grew up with are no longer sufficient to guide him in his roles as father, husband, friend, and employee."

New York Times contributor Matt Bai discussed Hank's political perspective in 2005, writing, "[L]ike a lot of the basically conservative voters you meet in rural America ... Hank never professes an explicit party loyalty, and he and his buddies who sip beer in the alley don't talk like their fellow Texan Tom DeLay. If Hank votes Republican, it's because, as a voter who cares about religious and rural values, he probably doesn't see much choice. But Hank and his neighbors resemble many independent voters, open to proposals that challenge their assumptions about the world, as long as those ideas don't come from someone who seems to disrespect what they believe."

In 1997, Texas Monthly included Hank Hill on its annual "Texas Twenty" list of "the most impressive, intriguing, and influential Texans".  He was the first "non-human" to make the list.  An accompanying mock interview described him as "perhaps the most recognized Texan in the world".

Ten years later, Associated Press television critic Frazier Moore described Hank as "more than ever ... a man on the spot, torn between squabbling, widening extremes. . . the man politicians always glorify in campaign speeches, but conveniently forget once they win: the ordinary guy, just trying to get by."  Moore opined that Hank "was a remarkable invention 10 years ago" and the fact that the show was "still funny and savvy" a decade later was "even more notable".

Appearances in other media

Besides King of the Hill, Hank has made guest appearances on other shows, including:

See also

List of King of the Hill characters

Notes

References

External links

King of the Hill characters
Television characters introduced in 1997
Animated characters introduced in 1997
Fictional salespeople
Fictional players of American football
Fictional characters from The Bronx
Fictional characters from Texas
Fictional Republicans (United States)
Male characters in animated series